Gaius Marcius Censorinus can refer to:

 Gaius Marcius Censorinus (Marian), general who fought against Sulla
 Gaius Marcius Censorinus (consul 8 BC)